Mugu  is a village development committee in the Himalayas of Mugu District in the Karnali Zone of north-western Nepal. After Dolphu it is the second largest VDC in Mugu District which takes its name from it. It is located on the border with Tibet, China. At the time of the 1991 Nepal census it had a population of 898 people living in 181 individual households.

References

External links
UN map of the municipalities of Mugu District

Populated places in Mugu District